Neil Mildenhall (born 8 September 1968) is an Australian rules footballer who played for the Fremantle Dockers in 1995. He was drafted from West Perth in the WAFL as a predraft selection in the 1994 AFL Draft and played mainly as a wingman.

Originally from Victoria, Mildenhall moved to WA in 1993 to play for West Perth and was an immediate success, winning the Sandover Medal in that year.  A tall wingman, he had limited success in the AFL with Fremantle, but remained a regular player for West Perth, playing 100 games for the Falcons and being a member of their 1995 premiership side. 

Since retiring from playing, Mildenhall has continued to be involved as a coach of the West Perth colts and was an assistant coach for the state under 18s squad in 2006.

External links

1968 births
Fremantle Football Club players
West Perth Football Club players
Sandover Medal winners
Living people
Australian rules footballers from Victoria (Australia)